You Are Not Alone is the eighth studio album by American gospel and soul singer Mavis Staples, released September 14, 2010 on ANTI- Records. It won the Grammy Award for Best Americana Album at the 53rd annual Grammy Awards.

Reception 
At Metacritic, which assigns a normalized rating out of 100 to reviews from mainstream critics, the album received an average score of 81, based on 16 reviews, which indicates "universal acclaim".

Track listing 

 "Don't Knock" (2:30)
 "You Are Not Alone" (3:57)
 "Downward Road" (3:08)
 "In Christ There Is No East or West" (3:36)
 "Creep Along Moses" (2:57)
 "Losing You" (2:52)
 "I Belong to the Band" (3:31)
 "Last Train" (4:29)
 "Only the Lord Knows" (3:44)
 "Wrote a Song for Everyone" (3:47)
 "We're Gonna Make It" (3:27)
 "Wonderful Savior" (2:05)
 "Too Close/On My Way to Heaven" (5:10)

References

External links
 You Are Not Alone at ANTI- website

Mavis Staples albums
2010 albums
Anti- (record label) albums
Albums produced by Jeff Tweedy
Grammy Award for Best Americana Album